In mathematics, the Alexander polynomial is a knot invariant which assigns a polynomial with integer coefficients to each knot type.  James Waddell Alexander II discovered this, the first knot polynomial, in 1923.  In 1969, John Conway showed a version of this polynomial, now called the Alexander–Conway polynomial, could be computed using a skein relation, although its significance was not realized until the discovery of the Jones polynomial in 1984.  Soon after Conway's reworking of the Alexander polynomial, it was realized that a similar skein relation was exhibited in Alexander's paper on his polynomial.

Definition
Let K be a knot in the 3-sphere.  Let X be the infinite cyclic cover of the knot complement of K.  This covering can be obtained by cutting the knot complement along a Seifert surface of K and gluing together infinitely many copies of the resulting manifold with boundary in a cyclic manner.  There is a covering transformation t acting on X.  Consider the first homology (with integer coefficients) of X, denoted .  The transformation t acts on the homology and so we can consider  a module over the ring of Laurent polynomials .  This is called the Alexander invariant or Alexander module.

The module is finitely presentable; a presentation matrix for this module is called the Alexander matrix.  If the number of generators, is less than or equal to the number of relations, then we consider the ideal generated by all  minors of the matrix; this is the zeroth Fitting ideal or Alexander ideal and does not depend on choice of presentation matrix.  If , set the ideal equal to 0.  If the Alexander ideal is principal, take a generator; this is called an Alexander polynomial of the knot.  Since this is only unique up to multiplication by the Laurent monomial , one often fixes a particular unique form.  Alexander's choice of normalization is to make the polynomial have a positive constant term.

Alexander proved that the Alexander ideal is nonzero and always principal. Thus an Alexander polynomial always exists, and is clearly a knot invariant, denoted . In other words, it cannot distinguish between a knot and its mirror image.

Computing the polynomial
The following procedure for computing the Alexander polynomial was given by J. W. Alexander in his paper.

Take an oriented diagram  of the knot with  crossings; there are  regions of the knot diagram. To work out the Alexander polynomial, first one must create an incidence matrix of size .  The  rows correspond to the  crossings, and the  columns to the regions. The values for the matrix entries are either .

Consider the entry corresponding to a particular region and crossing. If the region is not adjacent to the crossing, the entry is 0. If the region is adjacent to the crossing, the entry depends on its location. The following table gives the entry, determined by the location of the region at the crossing from the perspective of the incoming undercrossing line.

 on the left before undercrossing: 
 on the right before undercrossing:  
 on the left after undercrossing: 
 on the right after undercrossing: 

Remove two columns corresponding to adjacent regions from the matrix, and work out the determinant of the new  matrix. This gives the Alexander polynomial.

The Alexander polynomial can also be computed from the Seifert matrix.

After the work of J. W. Alexander, Ralph Fox considered a copresentation of the knot group , and introduced non-commutative differential calculus , which also permits one to compute . Detailed exposition of this approach about higher Alexander polynomials can be found in the book .

Basic properties of the polynomial

The Alexander polynomial is symmetric:  for all knots K.

Furthermore, the Alexander polynomial evaluates to a unit on 1: .

 From the point of view of the definition, this is an expression of the fact that the knot complement is a homology circle, generated by the covering transformation . More generally if  is a 3-manifold such that  it has an Alexander polynomial  defined as the order ideal of its infinite-cyclic covering space.

It is known that every integral Laurent polynomial which is both symmetric and evaluates to a unit at 1 is the Alexander polynomial of a knot (Kawauchi 1996).

Geometric significance of the polynomial

Since the Alexander ideal is principal,  if and only if the commutator subgroup of the knot group is perfect (i.e. equal to its own commutator subgroup).

For a topologically slice knot, the Alexander polynomial satisfies the Fox–Milnor condition  where  is some other integral Laurent polynomial.

Twice the knot genus is bounded below by the degree of the Alexander polynomial.

Michael Freedman proved that a knot in the 3-sphere is topologically slice; i.e., bounds a "locally-flat" topological disc in the 4-ball, if the Alexander polynomial of the knot is trivial (Freedman and Quinn, 1990).

Kauffman describes the first construction of the Alexander polynomial via state sums derived from physical models. A survey of these topic and other connections with physics are given in.

There are other relations with surfaces and smooth 4-dimensional topology. For example, under certain assumptions, there is a way of modifying a smooth 4-manifold by performing a surgery that consists of removing a neighborhood of a two-dimensional torus and replacing it with a knot complement crossed with S1. The result is a smooth 4-manifold homeomorphic to the original, though now the Seiberg–Witten invariant has been modified by multiplication with the Alexander polynomial of the knot.

Knots with symmetries are known to have restricted Alexander polynomials. See the symmetry section in (Kawauchi 1996). Nonetheless, the Alexander polynomial can fail to detect some symmetries, such as strong invertibility.

If the knot complement fibers over the circle, then the Alexander polynomial of the knot is known to be monic (the coefficients of the highest and lowest order terms are equal to ). In fact, if  is a fiber bundle where  is the knot complement, let  represent the monodromy, then  where  is the induced map on homology.

Relations to satellite operations

Examples: For a connect-sum . If  is an untwisted Whitehead double, then .

Alexander–Conway polynomial
Alexander proved the Alexander polynomial satisfies a skein relation.  John Conway later rediscovered this in a different form and showed that the skein relation together with a choice of value on the unknot was enough to determine the polynomial.  Conway's version is a polynomial in z with integer coefficients, denoted  and called the Alexander–Conway polynomial (also known as Conway polynomial or Conway–Alexander polynomial).

Suppose we are given an oriented link diagram, where  are link diagrams resulting from crossing and smoothing changes on a local region of a specified crossing of the diagram, as indicated in the figure.  

Here are Conway's skein relations:

  (where O is any diagram of the unknot)
 

Here  must be properly normalized (by multiplication of ) to satisfy the skein relation . Note that this relation gives a Laurent polynomial in t1/2.

See knot theory for an example computing the Conway polynomial of the trefoil.

Relation to Floer homology

Using pseudo-holomorphic curves,  and  associated a bigraded abelian group, called knot Floer homology, to each isotopy class of knots. The graded Euler characteristic of knot Floer homology is the Alexander polynomial. While the Alexander polynomial gives a lower bound on the genus of a knot,  showed that knot Floer homology detects the genus. Similarly, while the Alexander polynomial gives an obstruction to a knot complement fibering over the circle,  showed that knot Floer homology completely determines when a knot complement fibers over the circle. The knot Floer homology groups are part of the Heegaard Floer homology family of invariants; see Floer homology for further discussion.

Notes

References
 (accessible introduction utilizing a skein relation approach)

 (covers several different approaches, explains relations between different versions of the Alexander polynomial)

 (explains classical approach using the Alexander invariant; knot and link table with Alexander polynomials)

External links
 
  – knot and link tables with computed Alexander and Conway polynomials

Knot theory
Diagram algebras
Polynomials
John Horton Conway
Knot invariants